The 2021 season is United City Football Club's 10th in existence and 4th season in the top flight of Philippine football. This also marks as the second season the club plays as United City, after MMC Sportz took over the management of the club, which was formerly known as Ceres–Negros.

In addition to the Philippines Football League, United City as Ceres–Negros has also participated in the second-tier continental competition, and the AFC Champions League. United City intended to continue on participating in the AFC Champions League.

Squad

Transfers 
Note: Flags indicate national team as defined under FIFA eligibility rules. Players may hold more than one non-FIFA nationality.

Transfers in

Transfers out

Team statistics

Appearances and goals

Competitions

Overview

Copa Paulino Alcantara

Group A

AFC Champions League

Group stage

Notes

References

External links 
  (Official website)
  (Official website as Ceres-Negros)

United City 2021
United City 2021